Siewert  is the surname of:

 Alfons Siewert (1872-1922), Ukrainian physician
 Brian Siewert, television composer
 Clara Siewert (1862–1945), German Symbolist painter, graphic artist and sculptor
 Eva Siewert (1907–1994), German writer
 Jake Siewert (born 1964), former White House Press Secretary; Goldman Sachs (2012– )
 Rachel Siewert (born 1961), politician
 Robert Siewert (1887–1973), politician and prisoner
 Ruth Siewert (1915–2002), German contralto
 Steven Siewert, photojournalist

See also
 
 Sievert

Surnames from given names